Blackneck may refer to:

 Lygephila pastinum, also known commonly as the blackneck, a species of moth
 Blackneck garter snake (Thamnophis cyrtopsis), a species of snake
 Black-necked swan (Cygnus melanocoryphus), a species of bird
 Dark-shouldered snake eel (Ophichthus cephalozona), also known commonly as the black-neck snake eel

Animal common name disambiguation pages